Rima Elizabeth Horton (born 31 January 1947) is a retired English academic and former Labour Party politician. She was a member of the Kensington and Chelsea London Borough Council from 1986 to 2006, and worked as a senior lecturer at Kingston University.

Early life
Rima Elizabeth Horton was born in the Bayswater neighborhood of London, the third of four children of Elice Irene (née Frame) and Wilfred Stewart Horton. Her mother was from Wales while her father was London-born. Horton attended the co-Ed private St. Vincent's primary school, City of London School for Girls and later the University of Southampton.
She performed in theatre at school and then in several amateur groups, such as the Brook Drama Club which took her to Paris in 1962 when she was only 15. Fellow members reported that she already had a strong presence and a real talent for directing the group. At 18, she won the Most Promising Youngster Award at the Southhall Music & Drama Festival, where young Alan Rickman acted beside her.

Career
Horton won election as a Labour Party councillor on the Kensington and Chelsea London Borough Council in 1986, serving as its Chief Whip and a spokesperson on education during her tenure. She lost her place on the council in May 2006, as "part of the national shift" (in which there was a swing against Labour, who had been in government nationally for nine years by that point). She twice ran as a Labour candidate for Parliament, losing to the Conservative candidate both times. Horton also worked as a senior economics lecturer at Kingston University in London. She retired in 2012.

Horton served on the board of directors of The Making Place, a children's charity. She was appointed in 2002 and stepped down in 2005. She has also served on the board of trustees of the Gate Theatre in Notting Hill.

Writing
Horton was a contributor to The Elgar Companion to Radical Political Economy in 1994, penning a piece titled "Inequality". In it, she posed three questions: whether people are "naturally equal in essence"; whether and when the redistribution of wealth is justified; and, if so, how much is "fair"? She cited "much recent work" suggesting that health status and mortality rates in developed countries "actually depends on the distribution of income".

Personal life
Horton met aspiring actor Alan Rickman in 1965, when they both found themselves in an amateur theatre group at Chelsea College of Arts he was attending. She was 18 and he was 19. They were married in a private ceremony in New York City in 2012. Their marriage was announced publicly three years afterwards, in 2015. Horton lived with Rickman from 1977 until his death in January 2016. They had no children.

References

Footnotes

Sources
  Cited as Cabal 2005.
  Cited as Elgar 1994.
  Cited as Wood 1992.

1947 births
20th-century English women politicians
21st-century English women politicians
Academics of Kingston University
Alumni of the University of Southampton
Councillors in the Royal Borough of Kensington and Chelsea
Labour Party (UK) councillors
Labour Party (UK) parliamentary candidates
Living people
People educated at the City of London School for Girls
People from Kensington
Women councillors in England
English people of Welsh descent